The Theotokos Kosmosoteira is a Greek Orthodox monastery in Feres, Evros Prefecture, Greece. It was built around 1152 by the sebastokrator Isaac Komnenos, a son of the Byzantine emperor Alexios I Komnenos. The monastery became the core of the settlement of Feres, but is last attested in the mid-14th century. By the 15th-century, under the Ottoman Empire, the complex was a mosque; it again became a church in 1940.

History
Isaac began construction of the monastery, which was meant as his residence and final resting place, sometime before 1152. The site, known as Bera (from a Slavic word for "marsh") was then uninhabited and densely overgrown location, but the main church (katholikon) was apparently erected on the remains of an earlier, possibly Roman-era, building.

Isaac drafted its regulations (typikon) himself, with those of the Theotokos Euergetis Monastery at Constantinople as his model. Isaac stipulated it as a cenobitic monastery for 74 monks, of whom 50 choir brothers (free from menial labour and dedicated to the church services), all over 30 years old. Eunuchs were explicitly barred. The monastery was under the local metropolitan bishopric of Trajanopolis.

The complex was surrounded by a double fortified wall, with fortified gates and towers, of which only the interior can be traced: it apparently had a roughly hexagonal form, with towers at each corner, of which three survive in relatively good shape. It included a cistern, mill, and library, as well as a 36-bed hospital for the elderly and a bathhouse open to use by the local villagers. To support its operation and ensure its financial independence, Isaac endowed the monastery with extensive estates across Thrace. Isaac also built two bridges over the Evros river in the area, for whose upkeep the monastery's abbot was made responsible.

In winter 1183/84, Emperor Andronikos I Komnenos, Isaac's son, visited the monastery where his father was buried. In April 1195, the deposed emperor Isaac II Angelos was blinded there. In the partition of the Byzantine Empire after the Fourth Crusade, Bera fell to the individual Crusaders' share, and came under the control of Geoffrey of Villehardouin, who sent his nephew Anseau de Courcelles to take over the monastery and his other fiefs in the region. In the 1300s, an abbot by the name of John is attested.

Gradually, the monastery became the core of a larger settlement, which due to the endemic wars of the 14th century became the fortified town of Feres, where the local peasants sought refuge during invasions and civil wars of the period. The monastery functioned until the mid-14th century. Bera was conquered by the Ottomans under Lala Shahin Pasha in the early 1370s, and by 1433, the katholikon church had been converted into a mosque, by the name Suleyman Pasha Mosque. After the area became part of Greece in 1920, the katholikon was restored and reconsecrated as a church in 1940.

Katholikon

The main surviving structure is the large main church (katholikon), a modified cross-in-square church. The building measures 23×17 m and is 17 m high. On its southeastern corner, there is a brick decoration with an eagle motif. The narthex on the western side has been destroyed. Apart from the main entrance on the western side, there is a side door in the middle of the northern wall. The building shows extensive later repairs on the central apse and the prothesis, as well as the addition of four external buttresses. The roof is covered in lead sheets, as ordained by Isaac himself.

The interior space is dominated by the large dome on a twelve-sided base. Through a clever architectural arrangement that hides the dome supports in the main walls of the tabernacle and on two column pairs (possibly spolia), the interior is large and spacious, an effect enhanced by the many windows piercing the dome. The main dome is surrounded by four smaller ones on the corners of the building.

The 12th-century frescoes are an excellent example of the contemporary Constantinopolitan School. On the northern and southern walls are large representations of military saints, with features borrowed from Isaac's relatives of the Komnenos dynasty: his father Alexios I on the left on the northern side, and possibly his older brother Andronikos on the right; and his oldest brother John II Komnenos left and Isaac himself on the right on the southern side. Surviving frescoes include representations of the Presentation of Jesus at the Temple, the Pentecost, the Communion of the Apostles, the Theotokos praying, prelates and prophets, and six-winged seraphs. The cover of Isaac's tomb survives, but its original location within the church is unknown.

See also 
 History of Roman and Byzantine domes

References

External links 
 

Byzantine church buildings in Greece
12th-century Eastern Orthodox church buildings
Buildings and structures in Evros (regional unit)
Former Christian monasteries
Mosques converted from churches in Ottoman Greece
Churches completed in 1152
Christian monasteries established in the 12th century
Burial sites of the Komnenos dynasty
12th-century churches in Greece
Byzantine monasteries in Greece
Former mosques in Greece
Church buildings with domes